Cryptoblabes alphitias is a species of snout moth in the genus Cryptoblabes. It was described by Alfred Jefferis Turner in 1913. It is found in Australia. The holotype (female) was collected in Kuranda, Queensland.

References

Moths described in 1913
Cryptoblabini